The Cooperative Hall of Fame recognizes individuals from the United States who have made outstanding contributions to cooperatives. The Hall of Fame was established in 1974 and is administered by the Cooperative Development Foundation. Nominations from the cooperative community are reviewed yearly by two committees composed of cooperative leaders. The committees make recommendations to the Board of Directors of National Cooperative Business Association (NCBA), who make the final decision.

The Cooperative League of the USA (now the NCBA) announced a Hall of Fame at its 29th biennial conference in San Francisco. The Cooperative Hall of Fame and Historical Society was established in 1974. By 1990, 64 people were inducted in the Hall. The Hall is located at NCBA's headquarters in Washington, D.C. As of 2012, there are 153 inductees, dubbed "heroes" by the Hall.

Inductees

See also
Credit unions in the United States
History of the cooperative movement

References

External links
Cooperative Hall of Fame website

Videos of Hall of Fame speeches

1976 establishments in the United States
Halls of fame in Washington, D.C.
Cooperatives in the United States
Cooperative movement
Businesspeople halls of fame